Haigh is a surname. Notable people with the surname include:

Andrew Haigh, British film director
Arthur Haigh, British rugby player
Bernard Parker Haigh, professor at the Royal Naval College who contributed to modern theories of metal fatigue
Christopher Haigh, British historian
Elizabeth Haigh, Singaporean chef
Frank Haigh, British rugby player
Frank Haydn Haigh, New Zealand lawyer and social reformer
George Henry Caton Haigh, English ornithologist
Gideon Haigh, Australian journalist
Jennifer Haigh, American writer
John George Haigh, English serial killer
Kenneth Haigh, English actor
Louise Haigh, British Labour Co-operative politician
Nancy Haigh, American set designer
Philip A. Haigh, British historian and author
Schofield Haigh, British cricketer
Thomas Haigh, English musician

References

See also 

 Hague (disambiguation)

English-language surnames
Surnames of English origin